The SNECMA Turbomeca Larzac is a military turbofan manufactured by GRTS (Groupement Turbomeca-SNECMA), a consortium between the two French companies, SNECMA and Turbomeca. Its main application was on the Dassault/Dornier Alpha Jet.

Variants
49-01
04-C6
04-C20
04-H-20

Applications
 Dassault/Dornier Alpha Jet
 HAL HJT-36

Specifications (Larzac 04-C6)

See also

References
Notes

Bibliography

 Gunston, Bill. World Encyclopedia of Aero Engines. Cambridge, England. Patrick Stephens Limited, 1989.

External links

 Product page

Low-bypass turbofan engines
1960s turbofan engines
Axial-compressor gas turbine engines